Iat is a minor ancient Egyptian goddess. The abbreviation IAT may refer to:

Organisations
 Immigration Appeal Tribunal
 Indonesia Air Transport, an Indonesian airline
 Institute for Affordable Transportation, an American organization
 Institute of Armament Technology, now the Defence Institute of Advanced Technology, an Indian defense institution
 International Academy of Trenton, a SABIS charter school in Trenton, New Jersey, United States
 International Association of Trichologists
 Institute of Agricultural Technology, the former name of Kelappaji College of Agricultural Engineering and Technology

Science and technology
 Implicit-association test, a measure within social psychology
 Import Address Table, in computer programming
 Indicated air temperature
 Indirect antiglobulin test, a clinical blood test
 Information access technology
 Intake air temperature
 International Atomic Time
 Information Assurance Technical, a category for Certified Information Systems Security Professional

Other uses
 Indigenous Aryan Theory
 International ACH Transaction, a code used by the Automated Clearing House
 International Appalachian Trail, a hiking trail in the United States
 Iwate Asahi Television, a Japanese television station
 International Air Tattoo, the former name of a British air show